Bignonia callistegioides, also known as violet trumpet vine and lavender trumpet vine, is a vine native to southern Brazil and Argentina.

Description

It is a moderately fast growing, woody, evergreen perennial vine that reaches a height of 6 to 15 metres (20 to 50 feet), where it features bifoliate, hairless green leaves with tendrils. 

It's tubular flowers are lavender to lilac blue which are borne from spring to summer. They feature a white to yellow throat with conspicuous floral violet veins. The fruit is a brown capsule that produces winged seeds.

Cultivation
It is a heat-loving, frost tolerant plant that is grown as a ornamental plant on trellises, arbors, pergolas, wall covers or as a sprawling groundcover. It can be growing from stem cuttings or tip layering.

References

callistegioides
Plants described in 1832